The Qualification for Employments Act 1726 (13 Geo. 1, c. 29) was an Act of Parliament passed by the Parliament of Great Britain during the reign of George I. This was the first Indemnity Act that relieved Nonconformists from the requirements in the Test Act 1673 and the Corporation Act 1661 that public office holders must have taken the sacrament of the Lord's Supper in an Anglican church.

The Act was intended to give "further time to persons on board the fleet, or beyond the seas in his Majesty's service to qualify themselves for the legal enjoyment of offices and employments, and for the better ascertaining of such time". Nonconformists were described as those who were "zealously affected to his person and government, and the protestant succession to his royal house".

Notes

1726 in law
Great Britain Acts of Parliament 1726